Nikos Nikolaou (1909–1986) was a major figure in Greek art during the 20th century.

In 1929 Nikolaou was admitted into the Athens School of Fine Arts, where he studied under Konstantinos Parthenis and Umbertos Argyros.

In 1932, he had his first exhibition when he participated in the group exhibition of the Athens School of Fine Arts students. In 1935 he became a member of the group "Free Artists" (Ελεύθεροι Καλλιτέχναι) and participated in the Parnassos exhibition. That same year, Nikolaou came to the defense of a new artist, Constantine Andreou, whose artwork was so lifelike he was accused of cheating. This was the start of a lifelong friendship between the two.

In 1937, Nikolaou followed Yiannis Moralis to Italy and in 1939 he received a scholarship to study in Paris.

In 1949 he formed, with other artists including Nikos Hadjikyriakos-Ghikas, Yannis Tsarouchis, Yiannis Moralis, Nikos Engonopoulos and Panayiotis Tetsis, the "Armos" art group.  This group had its first exhibition in 1950 in Athens' Zappeion.

In 1960 he moved to Aegina and his house became a meeting place for artists and others. A few years later, he managed to convince his long-time friend and colleague Andreou to buy a house on the island.

References

Notes

See also
Art in modern Greece
Contemporary Greek art

Modern painters
20th-century Greek painters
1909 births
1986 deaths
People from Hydra (island)